Below are the rosters for the 2015 CONCACAF U-20 Championship held in Jamaica from 9–24 January 2015.

Aruba
Head Coach:  Arent Bekhof

Canada
Head Coach:  Rob Gale

Cuba
Head Coach:  Willian Bennett

El Salvador
Head Coach:  Mauricio Alfaro

Guatemala
Head Coach:  Carlos Ruíz

Haiti
Head Coach:  Jérôme Velfert

Honduras
Head Coach:  Jorge Jiménez

Jamaica
Head Coach:  Theodore Whitmore

Mexico
Head Coach:  Sergio Almaguer

Panama
Head Coach:  Leonardo Pipino

Trinidad and Tobago
Head Coach:  Derek King

United States
Head Coach:  Tab Ramos

References

CONCACAF Under-20 Championship squads